West of Memphis is a 2012 New Zealand-American documentary film directed and co-written by Amy J. Berg, produced by Peter Jackson and Damien Echols, and released in the US by Sony Pictures Classics to critical acclaim. It received a nomination for Best Documentary Screenplay from the Writers Guild of America.

Background
As with the Paradise Lost film and its two sequels, West of Memphis follows the events of the West Memphis Three, a case in which three teenagers (Jessie Misskelley, Damien Echols and Jason Baldwin) were arrested for the murders of three 8-year-old children.

The West Memphis Three were subsequently convicted of murder and remained in prison for more than 18 years. West of Memphis focuses on Terry Hobbs, stepfather of Stevie Branch, one of the victims of the 1993 crime, as a potential suspect due to physical evidence linking him to the crime, a history of violent behavior and his lack of an alibi for the time the murders were committed, as well as damaging statements made by his ex-wife, former neighbors, and most recently his own nephew, who claims Hobbs confessed to him. The film reveals that inexplicably Terry Hobbs was not interviewed by police at the time of the murders.

Since the 1996 release of the HBO Joe Berlinger and Bruce Sinofsky documentary, Paradise Lost: The Child Murders at Robin Hood Hills, supporters protested the innocence of the West Memphis Three. Much like the Paradise Lost films, West of Memphis chronicles the history of the imprisoned men all the way up to the eventual release through interviews conducted with lawyers, judges, journalists, family members, witnesses, and the West Memphis Three themselves. With the January 2012 HBO premiere of the third Paradise Lost film, Paradise Lost 3: Purgatory, there were two documentary films on the subject within a year.

West of Memphis premiered at the Sundance Film Festival on January 21, 2012, at the Deauville American Film Festival on September 2, 2012, and at the Toronto International Film Festival on September 8, 2012.

Critical reception
Writing in The Wall Street Journal, film critic Joe Morgenstern described West of Memphis as "a devastating account of police incompetence, civic hysteria and prosecutorial behavior that was totally at odds with a vastly persuasive body of evidence uncovered in a privately funded investigation". Director Amy Berg, wrote Morgenstern, "has a dramatist's eye for what was irretrievably lost — the innocent lives of the children, plus 18 years of three other innocent lives. And she saw, equally well, what was there to be gained: dramatic new insights into an inexorable progression from random arrests through groundless supposition, fevered conjecture and flagrant perjury to official disgrace in a supposedly airtight case."

Film critic Philip French of The Observer called West of Memphis "riveting", and a "shocking indictment of the American criminal justice system and a tribute to the dedication of selfless civil rights lawyers and their supporters from all over the world".

Owen Gleiberman of Entertainment Weekly gave the film an "A−" and wrote that it "casts a hypnotic spell all its own. It artfully sketches out the events for anyone who's coming in cold, but basically, its strategy is to take what we already know and go deeper. ... West of Memphis goes after another possible suspect, Terry Hobbs, who was stepfather to one of the victims and who has denied any involvement. In doing so, the film reframes the story's terrible darkness, even if it can't give us the closure we hunger for."

Roger Ebert of Chicago Sun-Times gave the film a perfect four star rating, writing: "Do we need a fourth film? Yes, I think we do. If you only see one of them, this is the one to choose, because it has the benefit of hindsight."

See also
 Paradise Lost: The Child Murders at Robin Hood Hills, the original 1996 film on the trial of the West Memphis Three
 Paradise Lost 2: Revelations, which follows up on the appeals and post-trial controversy
 Paradise Lost 3: Purgatory, which was supposed to follow the West Memphis Three as they remained in prison, but was changed to their release after the West Memphis Three were released from prison
 Devil's Knot: The True Story of the West Memphis Three, a 2002 true crime book by Mara Leveritt
 Devil's Knot (film), a 2013 fictionalized retelling of the events around the West Memphis Three

References

External links
 
 
 
 
 

2012 films
2012 documentary films
American documentary films
New Zealand documentary films
Films about lawyers
Films directed by Amy J. Berg
Films scored by Nick Cave
Films scored by Warren Ellis (musician)
Films set in 1993
Documentary films about miscarriage of justice in the United States
WingNut Films films
Sony Pictures Classics films
West Memphis Three
2010s English-language films
2010s American films
Films produced by Peter Jackson